Abasebenzi was published from 1973 to 1976 by the Wages Commission, Student's Representative Council at the University of Cape Town and aimed to create awareness by informing workers in the Western Cape (mainly Cape Town) of the importance of worker unity, organisation and representation in order to protect their interests, better their wages and working conditions and end worker exploitation. Information about collective bargaining, formation of liaison committees, works committees and trade unions was made available in order to empower workers in their struggle. Abasebenzi also endeavoured to assist individual workers with particular problems and articles included information about overtime, unemployment insurance and workmen's compensation. In 1976, five issues and all future issues were banned and publication was forced to cease.

Further reading
 
 

1973 establishments in South Africa
1976 disestablishments in South Africa
Censorship in South Africa
Defunct magazines published in South Africa
Defunct political magazines
Magazines established in 1973
Magazines disestablished in 1976
Multilingual magazines
Mass media in Cape Town
University of Cape Town